1993 in Korea may refer to:
1993 in North Korea
1993 in South Korea